Matheus Henrique Cassini de Paula (born 15 February 1996), known as Matheus Cassini, is a Brazilian footballer who plays for USL League One club South Georgia Tormenta. Mainly an attacking midfielder, he can also play as a left winger.

Club career
Born in São Paulo, Cassini started his career with hometown club Corinthians, where he was seen as a promising youngster. He was snapped up by Italian side Palermo on 26 May 2015, for a reported fee of R$3.5 million, after rejecting contract renewal talks with Timão. Upon arriving, he was given the number 9 shirt, and was expected to feature heavily for the first team.

After only appearing for the Primavera team, Cassini was loaned to Croatian side NK Inter Zaprešić on 26 January 2016. He made his senior debut on 2 March, coming on as a second-half substitute for Jakov Puljić in a 2–1 away win against NK Lokomotiva.

After contributing with six appearances, all from the bench, Cassini was loaned to Lega Pro side Siracusa Calcio on 23 August 2016. The following 31 January, after being reportedly unhappy at the club, he rescinded his contract with the Rosaneros.

After being linked to a possible return to his former club Corinthians, Cassini signed a five-month deal with fellow Campeonato Brasileiro Série A club Ponte Preta, with an option for a further year. On 9 June 2017, after appearing rarely for Ponte, he signed for Santos until the end of the year, with a three-year option, being initially assigned to the B-team.

On 19 September 2017, after appearing rarely even with the B-side, Cassini cut ties with Santos and joined Oeste.

On 18 January 2018, Cassini signed a 2.5-year contract with French Ligue 1 club Amiens SC. However, the club was not able to register him, because they had too many foreign players in their squad. The club terminated the loan deal of Nathan in February, and the club then registered him for their squad. In August 2021, Cassini moved to Bulgarian club Botev Vratsa on a contract envisioned to be for two seasons.

Cassini joined USL League One club Forward Madison on 20 January 2022. In January 2023, Cassini signed with USL League One's South Georgia Tormenta for the 2023 season.

Career statistics

References

External links

1996 births
Living people
Footballers from São Paulo
Brazilian footballers
Association football midfielders
Sport Club Corinthians Paulista players
Associação Atlética Ponte Preta players
Santos FC players
Oeste Futebol Clube players
Fluminense FC players
Serie C players
Palermo F.C. players
U.S. Siracusa players
Croatian Football League players
NK Inter Zaprešić players
Championnat National 3 players
Amiens SC players
G.D. Estoril Praia players
Forward Madison FC players
Tormenta FC players
Brazilian expatriate footballers
Brazilian expatriate sportspeople in Italy
Brazilian expatriate sportspeople in Croatia
Brazilian expatriate sportspeople in France
Brazilian expatriate sportspeople in Portugal
Brazilian expatriate sportspeople in the United States
Expatriate footballers in Italy
Expatriate footballers in Croatia
Expatriate footballers in France
Expatriate footballers in Portugal
Expatriate soccer players in the United States
USL League One players